The Clover Stakes was an American Thoroughbred horse race run forty-one times at New York State's Gravesend and Aqueduct racetracks between 1888 and 1932. A race for two-year-old fillies, it was contested over a distance of five furlongs on dirt.

The first Clover Stakes was hosted by Gravesend Race Track from inception in 1888 and run through 1908 and then for a last time in 1910. Passage of the Hart–Agnew anti-betting legislation by the New York Legislature under Governor Charles Evans Hughes led to a compete shutdown of racing in 1911 and 1912 in the state. A February 21, 1913 ruling by the New York Supreme Court, Appellate Division saw horse racing return in 1913. However, it was too late for the Gravesend horse racing facility and it never reopened.

Picked up by the operators of the Aqueduct Racetrack, the Clover Stakes returned in 1914 and would run continuously through 1932. The valuable race then fell victim to the effects of the Great Depression in the United States which forced track owners to cut costs dramatically and eliminate some events in order to provide funding support for others.

The final edition was run on June 15, 1932 and was won by Sonny Whitney's Disdainful, stablemate of his Champion and U.S. Racing Hall of Fame inductee Top Flight who won the 1931 running of the Clover Stakes.

Records
Speed record:
 0:58 flat @ 5 furlongs : Top Flight (1931)
 0:55 2/5 @ 4.5 furlongs : Sweet Lavender (1900)

Most wins by a jockey:
 3 – Fred Littlefield (1890, 1894, 1900)

Most wins by a trainer:
 6 – James G. Rowe Sr. (1888, 1907, 1908, 1916, 1917, 1923)

Most wins by an owner:
 6 – Harry Payne Whitney (1916, 1919, 1923, 1924, 1926, 1929)

Winners

References

1888 establishments in New York (state)
Recurring sporting events established in 1888
Discontinued horse races in New York City
Gravesend Race Track
Aqueduct Racetrack
Flat horse races for two-year-old fillies
1932 disestablishments in New York (state)